Capricious is an aged goat's milk cheese made by the Achadinha Cheese Company in Petaluma, California. It won "Best in Show" at the 2002 American Cheese Society awards.

See also

List of American cheeses
 List of goat milk cheeses

References

External links
Achadinha Cheese Company website
Achadinha profile (YouTube)

Food and drink in the San Francisco Bay Area
American cheeses
Washed-rind cheeses
Petaluma, California
Cheesemakers
Goat's-milk cheeses
Dairy products companies of the United States